The Masangxi Bridge is a cable-stayed bridge which crosses the Yangtze River in Chongqing, China. The bridge carries 6 lanes of traffic on the G75 Lanzhou–Haikou Expressway between the Banan District east of the Yangtze River and the Dadukou District to the west.

See also
Yangtze River bridges and tunnels

External links
http://sunengineering.cn/siteen/xdxxhgcjsyzsgc/891.html

References

Bridges in Chongqing
Bridges over the Yangtze River
Cable-stayed bridges in China
Bridges completed in 2001